Jean Delarge (6 April 1906 – 7 July 1977) was a Belgian welterweight professional boxer who competed in the 1920s. He was born in Liège. Delarge won the gold medal in boxing at the 1924 Summer Olympics in the welterweight category, defeating Héctor Méndez in the final.

References

External links
 
 
 Jean Delarge's profile

1906 births
1977 deaths
Welterweight boxers
Olympic boxers of Belgium
Boxers at the 1924 Summer Olympics
Olympic gold medalists for Belgium
Olympic medalists in boxing
Sportspeople from Liège
Belgian male boxers
Medalists at the 1924 Summer Olympics